Buddy the Gob is a 1934 Warner Bros. Looney Tunes cartoon, the first directed by Friz Freleng. The short was released on January 5, 1934, and stars Buddy, the second star of the series.

The theme music played at the beginning is "Columbia, the Gem of the Ocean."

Summary
A great Navy gunboat sails toward the audience and fires her weapons; several other ships go on behind it. Buddy is a "gob", a sailor onboard one of the ships, and is excited to see that they have made port in China. Jumping from the side of his ship and into a rowboat, Our Hero makes his way to land.

In the Chinese city, now, we see that a large woman carries her four children, attached by their hair to a pole straddled across her shoulders; Buddy turns a corner and sees an older gentleman expand and compress himself vertically in order to read a poster on the side of a building; when the man has left, Buddy goes to read the message, which converts, for our benefit, into English: "Grand Celebration To-day: the 150th Birthday Anniversary of the Sacred Dragon: a beautiful girl will be sacrificed to the Dragon. Come one! Come all!" Leaping from straw hat-to-straw hat of five men arranged from back-to-front in ascending order of height, Buddy manages to see the grand celebration: a baton wielder bounces his belly; a drum, held by two marchers, is host to six tiny people who jump upon it; in addition to trumpeters and tiny men whose hats double as cymbals, the procession happens to include a pianist! One of the masked dancers in the parade is a caricature of Jimmy Durante (a favorite target of Warner Bros. cartoons of the time.)

Then we see the young girl to be sacrificed, in her cage, carried by two marchers; she begs for help and weeps. Buddy is not about to let the ritual occur. But when he attempts to enter the temple into which the girl has been taken, he is ejected from the very steps by spear, and thus caught on a wall by the seat of his pants. Once free, Our Hero hears the girl's screams from a window several stories above him. When his attempt at propelling himself to the window by means of the spear fails, Buddy simply picks up a piece of a gate and fires the spear-like points of it, as though they were arrows, at the wall of the prison-temple, thereby forming a series of steps up which he can easily walk to reach the girl's holding cell.

The girl's keeper locks her cuffs, swallows the key, and steps out of the room, leaving the girl to be terrified by the imprisoned, fire-breathing dragon across the room from her. Buddy enters, but can not seem to break the lock; so he knocks on the door, and stands aside, picking up a nearby barrel: the keeper steps inside, and Buddy slams the barrel over the villain's head and body, dazing him. A swift kick in the pants, and the jailer coughs up the key. The brave little sailor frees the girl, but no sooner does he that than the bars entrapping the dragon rise and free the beast. At Buddy's direction, the girl leaps from the window to a waiting rickshaw beneath: Buddy, after enduring the dragon's flame on his behind, follows.

As the vehicle speedily makes away, a throng of angry, spear-wielding people notice that their sacrifice is escaping! When their rickshaw breaks upon hitting a rock, the driver himself becomes the escape vehicle, off of which Buddy and the girl get, preferring to run. They come to a bridge of wooden planks, suspended by ropes tied to stakes. Once on the bridge, Buddy, the rescued girl at his side, severs the ropes with a saw; the two run across as the bridge just as surely as it falls, plank-by-plank, behind them. From one side of the valley, the angry people helplessly protest the escape as Buddy and the girl tease their pursuers. One such pursuer hurls his spear all the way across; dodging this, the two continue to tease, but the spear, imbued with malevolent life, turns about and pricks Buddy's rear end before falling, lifeless, to the ground. A victorious but dazed Buddy stares into the camera as the cartoon ends.

Footage reused
The opening scene, in which the ship sails towards the camera and fires her guns, is recycled for a cinematic sequence in 1935's Buddy's Theatre.
Also the Mice play Yankee Doodle of the Drums was reused from It's Got Me Again!.

References

 Schneider, Steve (1990). That's All Folks!: The Art of Warner Bros. Animation. Henry Holt & Co.
 Beck, Jerry and Friedwald, Will (1989): Looney Tunes and Merrie Melodies: A Complete Illustrated Guide to the Warner Bros. Cartoons. Henry Holt and Company.

External links
 
 Buddy the Gob (Unrestored) on Dailymotion

1934 films
1934 animated films
1930s American animated films
1930s animated short films
American black-and-white films
Films scored by Norman Spencer (composer)
Animated films about dragons
Short films directed by Friz Freleng
Buddy (Looney Tunes) films
Films set in China
Looney Tunes shorts
Vitaphone short films